Gerard Ewout van Walsum (21 February 1900 – 27 July 1980) was a Dutch politician of the PvdA.

He was both a member of the House of Representatives and the Senate, councilor and alderman of Rotterdam, and mayor of Delft and Rotterdam.

He is most known for last one, which lasted from 1952 to 1965.

Van Walsum was born in Krimpen aan den IJssel and died in Rotterdam.

References 

1900 births
1980 deaths
20th-century Dutch politicians
Aldermen of Rotterdam
Labour Party (Netherlands) politicians
Mayors in South Holland
Mayors of Rotterdam
Members of the House of Representatives (Netherlands)
Members of the Senate (Netherlands)
Municipal councillors of Rotterdam
People from Delft
People from Krimpen aan den IJssel